Kosmos 1379 ( meaning Cosmos 1379) was a low orbit 'combat' satellite which was used by the Soviet Union on 18 June 1982 as an antisatellite demonstration; an exercise that the United States called a 'seven hour nuclear war'. Kosmos 1379 intercepted and destroyed Kosmos 1375 as a demonstration of Soviet anti-satellite capability. It was the last satellite to be launched as part of the Istrebitel Sputnikov programme.

References

Spacecraft launched in 1982
1982 in the Soviet Union
Kosmos satellites